Diego Hope Brown was an Argentine footballer who played for the Alumni Athletic Club. Brown was an Argentine of Scottish origin. Brown had five brothers who were Argentine international players – Alfredo, Carlos, Eliseo, Ernesto and Jorge – as well as one cousin, Juan Domingo. Another brother – Tomás – also played for Alumni Athletic Club.

References

Argentine footballers
Argentine people of Scottish descent
Alumni Athletic Club players
Year of death missing
Association footballers not categorized by position
Year of birth missing
Brown family (Argentina)